Ceriantheopsis is a genus of tube-dwelling anemones in the family Cerianthidae. Members of the genus are found only in the Atlantic Ocean. They are predators, scavengers and omnivores.

Species
Species in the genus include:
 Ceriantheopsis americana (Agassiz in Verrill, 1864)
 Ceriantheopsis austroafricanus Molodtsova, Griffiths & Acuna, 2011 - the burrowing anemone
 Ceriantheopsis lineata Stampar, Scarabino, Pastorino & Morandini, 2015
 Ceriantheopsis nikitai Molodtsova, 2001

References

Cerianthidae
Anthozoa genera